The University of Colorado Law School is one of the professional graduate schools within the University of Colorado System.  It is a public law school, with more than 500 students attending and working toward a Juris Doctor or Master of Studies in Law. The Wolf Law Building is located in Boulder, Colorado, and is sited on the south side of the University of Colorado at Boulder campus. The law school houses the William A. Wise Law Library, which is a regional archive for federal government materials and is open to the public. United States Supreme Court Justice Wiley Blount Rutledge graduated from the University of Colorado Law School in 1922.

The University of Colorado Law School consistently ranks in the top 50 law schools in U.S. News & World Report rankings (ranked 49th as of 2022). According to Colorado's official 2015 ABA-required disclosures, 74.2% of the Class of 2015 obtained full-time, long-term, JD-required employment nine months after graduation.  For 2015 graduates, the overall employment rate was 96% at 10 months after graduation, including JD-required, JD-advantaged, and other positions.

History 
Established in 1892, the University of Colorado Law School is a charter member in the Association of American Law Schools and appeared in 1923 on American Bar Association's first ever publication of approved law schools.  Although always located on the greater Boulder campus, the law school has occupied five buildings since its founding.  For the first two years of its existence, the school was housed in the Kent building.  From 1894 to 1909 the school occupied the Hale Law Building.  For the next 50 years, until 1959, the school occupied the Guggenheim Law Building.  From 1959 to 2005, the law school occupied the Fleming Law Building.  In the fall of 2006, the law school once again moved and now sits in the Wolf Law Building.

The Wolf Law Building 
By the late 1990s, Colorado Law had outgrown its building. In 1997 law students voted to tax themselves with a $1,000 per year tuition differential to help finance the building, but in 2001 the State of Colorado General Assembly rescinded its earmarked funds from the project. Facing the risk of accreditation loss, law students worked with campus leaders and successfully passed a $400 per year fee on all Boulder students to fund capital construction on the Wolf Law Building and three other campus projects. The Wolf Law Building was dedicated on September 8, 2006, by United States Supreme Court justice Stephen Breyer. The dedication ceremony represented the end of a long and creative funding process for a public law school.

In addition to student funds, over $13 million in private gifts were donated to support the construction of the new law building. The Wolf family, in honor of Leon and Dora Wolf, were especially generous in their contribution to the new building that now bears their family name.

The Wolf Law Building was constructed under the United States Green Building Council's LEED certification rating system for environmental sustainability and received a Gold rating. Colorado Law is the second law school to be housed in a certified LEED building.

Admissions 
The school received 2,792 applications for the class of 2023 and matriculated 185 students. The 25th and 75th percentile LSAT scores for entering students were 158 and 164, respectively; the median LSAT was 163. The 25th and 75th percentile GPA for entering students was 3.39 and 3.78, with a median of 3.65.

Employment
According to Colorado's official 2015 ABA-required disclosures, 74.2% of the Class of 2015 obtained full-time, long-term, JD-required employment nine months after graduation. Colorado's Law School Transparency under-employment score is 8.8%, indicating the percentage of the Class of 2015 unemployed, pursuing an additional degree, or working in a non-professional, short-term, or part-time job nine months after graduation.

Costs
The total cost of attendance (indicating the cost of tuition, fees, and living expenses) at Colorado for the 2013-2014 academic year is $51,110 for residents and $58,620 for nonresidents. The Law School Transparency estimated debt-financed cost of attendance for three years is $197,814 for residents and $219,168 for nonresidents.

Controversial 2009 employment statistics
In October 2009, the journal Law Week Colorado stirred controversy when it reported that only 35% of the school's Class of 2009 had jobs at graduation.

Officials from the school assailed the Law Week Colorado article.  Former Assistant Dean of the Office of Career Development SuSaNi Harris called Law Week Colorado's report the product of a "miscalculation" and "misunderstanding" and claimed Law Week Colorado "confused 'employed' and 'unemployed.'" Later, Associate Dean Dayna Matthew told Law Week Colorado that the numbers released were "premature" and asserted that the National Association of Legal Professionals (NALP) would release more favorable statistics in February 2010. The reason, Matthew said, was that the NALP discounted graduates who did not report their employment status.

For its part, Law Week Colorado stuck to its original statistics and noted that the University of Colorado had not provided any new statistics.

Ranking 
In 2008, U.S. News & World Report ranked the University of Colorado Law School 32nd in the nation. In 2010, its ranking fell to 38th. In 2011, the school dropped to 47th, leading The Wall Street Journal to call the school "among the biggest fallers among the top 50". As of 2022, the University of Colorado Law School is ranked 49th in the country.

Experiential Learning at the University of Colorado Law School 
Clinics: the American Indian Law Clinic, the Civil Practice Clinic, the Criminal Defense Clinic, the Entrepreneurial Law Clinic, Family Law Clinic, the Juvenile Law Clinic, the Natural Resources Law Clinic, and the Samuelson-Glushko Technology Law & Policy Clinic.
Externships 
Public Service Pledge
Appellate and Trial Competitions

Publications
University of Colorado Law Review
Colorado Natural Resources, Energy, and Environmental Law Review
Colorado Technology Law Journal

Notable alumni

United States Senators
Gordon L. Allott (LL.B. 1929), former U.S. senator from Colorado
Hank Brown (J.D. 1969),  former U.S. senator from Colorado and former president of the University of Colorado and the University of Northern Colorado
Cory Gardner (J.D. 2001), former U.S. senator from Colorado, former U.S. Representative from Colorado
Eugene Millikin (LL.B. 1913), former U.S. senator from Colorado
United States Representatives
Donald G. Brotzman (LL.B. 1949), former U.S. representative from Colorado
John Chenoweth (LL.B. 1916), former U.S. representative from Colorado
James Paul Johnson (LL.B. 1959), former U.S. representative from Colorado
John H. Marsalis (LL.B. 1934), former U.S. representative from Colorado
John J. McIntyre (LL.B. 1928), former U.S. representative from Wyoming, former justice of the Wyoming Supreme Court
Joe Neguse (J.D. 2009), U.S. representative from Colorado
Ed Perlmutter (J.D. 1978), U.S. representative from Colorado
U.S. Supreme Court Justices and Federal Appeals Court Judges
Jean Sala Breitenstein (LL.B. 1924), former judge of the U.S. Court of Appeals for the Tenth Circuit
William Edward Doyle (LL.B. 1940), former judge of the U.S. Court of Appeals for the Tenth Circuit
Wiley Blount Rutledge (LL.B. 1922), former associate justice of the Supreme Court of the United States 
Timothy Tymkovich (J.D. 1982), judge of the U.S. Court of Appeals for the Tenth Circuit, former solicitor general of Colorado
U.S. District Court Judges
Alfred A. Arraj (LL.B. 1928), former judge of the United States District Court for the District of Colorado
Robert E. Blackburn (J.D. 1974), judge of the United States District Court for the District of Colorado
Olin Hatfield Chilson (LL.B. 1927), former judge of the United States District Court for the District of Colorado
Larry R. Hicks (J.D. 1968), judge of United States District Court for the District of Nevada
Marcia S. Krieger (J.D. 1979), judge of the United States District Court for the District of Colorado
Walker David Miller (LL.B. 1963), former judge for the United States District Court for the District of Colorado
William J. Rea (LL.B. 1949), former judge of the United States District Court for the Central District of California
Edward Nottingham (J.D. 1972), former judge of the United States District Court for the District of Colorado
Waldo Henry Rogers (LL.B. 1931), former judge of the United States District Court for the District of New Mexico
Jacob Weinberger (LL.B. 1904), former judge of the United States District Court for the Southern District of California
Robert Wherry, former judge of the United States Tax Court
Fred M. Winner (LL.B. 1936), former judge of the United States District Court for the District of Colorado
Regina M. Rodriguez (J.D. 1988), judge of the United States District Court for the District of Colorado
United States Governors
George Alfred Carlson (LL.B. 1904), former governor of Colorado 
Ralph Lawrence Carr (LL.B. 1912), former governor of Colorado 
William Lee Knous (LL.B. 1911), former governor of Colorado 
Bill Ritter (J.D. 1981), former governor of Colorado, former district attorney of Denver County
Roy Romer (LL.B. 1952), former governor of Colorado
State Supreme Court Justices
Michael L. Bender (J.D. 1967), former chief justice of the Colorado Supreme Court
Nathan B. Coats (J.D. 1977), former chief justice of the Colorado Supreme Court
Carol Ronning Kapsner (J.D. 1977), justice of the North Dakota Supreme Court
Alex J. Martinez (J.D. 1976), former justice of the Colorado Supreme Court
William Neighbors (J.D. 1965), former justice of the Colorado Supreme Court
Luis Rovira (LL.B. 1950), former chief justice of the Colorado Supreme Court
Felix L. Sparks (LL.B. 1947), former justice of the Colorado Supreme Court, U.S. Army brigadier general
Federal Government Agency Administrators and Civil Service Personnel
Anne Gorsuch Burford (J.D. 1964), former administrator of the Environmental Protection Agency
Michael L. Connor, former commissioner U.S. Bureau of Reclamation and former deputy secretary, U.S. Department of Interior
Carlton R. Stoiber (J.D. 1969), former deputy general counsel for the Nuclear Regulatory Commission and former director of the U.S. Department of State Office of Nuclear Non-Proliferation Policy
Jason R. Dunn (J.D. 2001), former U.S. Attorney for the District of Colorado
Other State Government Elected Officials
Bernie Buescher (J.D. 1974), former secretary of state of Colorado
Morgan Carroll (J.D. 2000), Colorado Democratic Party Chair;  former member, Colorado Senate
Crisanta Duran (J.D. 2005), former speaker of the Colorado House of Representatives
Larry Jent (J.D. 1983), member of the Montana Senate
John Kellner (J.D. 2006), district attorney in Arapahoe, Douglas, and Lincoln counties
Robert Lee Knous (J.D. 1970), former lieutenant governor of Colorado
Jeanne Labuda (J.D. 1989), former member, Colorado House of Representatives
Tom Van Norman (J.D. 1993), former member, South Dakota House of Representatives
Dan Pabon (J.D. 2005), member, Colorado House of Representatives
Ellen Roberts (J.D. 1986), former member, Colorado Senate
Brandon Shaffer (J.D. 2001), former president of the Colorado State Senate
Pat Steadman (J.D. 1991), former member, Colorado Senate
John Suthers (J.D. 1977), mayor of Colorado Springs, former Attorney General of Colorado
George Thatcher (LL.B. 1904), Attorney General of Nevada
Academia
Frances Olsen (J.D. 1971),  professor of law at UCLA
Business
Louis O. Kelso (LL.B. 1938), founder of private equity firm Kelso & Company, inventor of the Employee Stock Ownership Plan
Floyd Odlum (LL.B. 1914), founder of Atlas Corporation, owner of RKO
Other
Stephen Coonts (J.D. 1979), thriller and suspense novelist
Vine Deloria, Jr. (J.D. 1970), Native American author, theologian, historian, and activist
Fred Folsom (LL.B. 1899), former NCAA football coach
Maggie L. Fox, CEO of the Alliance for Climate Protection
William Hybl, (J.D. 1967), chairman of the El Pomar Foundation and current President Emeritus of the United States Olympic Committee
Clara Ruth Mozzor (LL.B. 1915), first woman to serve as a U.S. assistant attorney general
Ellen Hart Peña (J.D. 1988), former world-class runner and lawyer
Manuel Ramos (J.D. 1973), noted attorney and author
Penfield Tate II (J.D. 1968), first African-American mayor of Boulder, Colorado

Notable faculty
James Anaya
Paul Campos
Wiley Young Daniel, judge on the United States District Court for the District of Colorado
Allison H. Eid, judge on the United States Court of Appeals for the Tenth Circuit
Maurice B. Foley, judge on the United States Tax Court
David Getches
Neil Gorsuch, Associate Justice on the Supreme Court of the United States 
Moses Hallett 
Melissa Hart, Justice on the Colorado Supreme Court
Margot Kaminski 
Alice Madden
Suzette M. Malveaux
Gene Nichol
Nancy E. Rice, Chief Justice of the Colorado Supreme Court
James Grafton Rogers
Pierre Schlag 
Don W. Sears
Mark Squillace
Phil Weiser
Charles Wilkinson

Centers 

The Energy and Environmental Security Initiative (EESI), established in 2003, is an interdisciplinary Research and Policy Institute.

The Getches-Wilkinson Center for Natural Resources, Energy, and the Environment programs for law students and the general public. It hosts an annual lecture on natural resources law that honors alumnus Ruth Wright and another lecture series focused on energy policy. The Ruth Wright Distinguished Lecture Series has hosted former Secretary of the Interior and Arizona governor Bruce Babbitt, former Department of the Interior deputy secretary Michael Connor, former Department of the Interior solicitor John Leshy, and law professor Mary Wood, while the Schultz Lecture in Energy has hosted former Secretary of Energy and physics professor Steven Chu.

The Byron R. White Center for the Study of American Constitutional Law, named after former Supreme Court Justice and University of Colorado alumnus Byron White, seeks to enhance the study and teaching of constitutional law and to stimulate public debate and understanding of the US constitutional system. The Center sponsors public lectures and symposia.

The Silicon Flatirons Center for Law, Technology, and Entrepreneurship hosts nine yearly seminars and an annual symposium, supporting the Entrepreneurial Law Clinic and developing student interest and involvement in the technology sector.

References

External links 

Law schools in Colorado
Environmental law schools
Law School
Educational institutions established in 1892
Natural resources law
1892 establishments in Colorado